Emily Armstrong (born 10 September 2000) is a Canadian synchronized swimmer. Armstrong won a gold medal in the team artistic swimming category at the 2019 Pan American Games. She competed at the 2018 FINA World Junior Synchronised Swimming Championships where she placed 6th in solo free, 8th in solo technical, and 8th in duet technical. Armstrong was a training member of Canada's national team in the lead-up to the delayed 2020 Summer Olympics which were postponed as a result of the COVID-19 pandemic.

References

External links 

Living people
2000 births
Canadian synchronized swimmers
Artistic swimmers at the 2019 Pan American Games
Pan American Games gold medalists for Canada
Pan American Games medalists in synchronized swimming
Medalists at the 2019 Pan American Games
Swimmers from Toronto
Synchronized swimmers at the 2020 Summer Olympics
Olympic synchronized swimmers of Canada
21st-century Canadian women